Kukatpally Assembly Constituency is a constituency of Telangana Legislative Assembly, India. It is one of 14 constituencies in Medchal-Malkajgiri district. It is part of Malkajgiri Lok Sabha constituency. It is also one of the 24 constituencies of GHMC.

Madhavaram Krishna Rao of Telangana Rashtra Samithi is currently representing the constituency.

Overview
A melting pot of people from different regions, states and cultures, Kukatpally was carved out of the Khairatabad Assembly constituency before the 2009 elections as per Delimitation Act of 2002. The Assembly Constituency currently comprises the following:

Members of Legislative Assembly

Election results

Telangana Legislative Assembly election, 2018

Telangana Legislative Assembly election, 2014

Andhra Pradesh Legislative Assembly election, 2009

See also 
 List of constituencies of Telangana Legislative Assembly
 Kukatpally

References

Assembly constituencies of Telangana
Ranga Reddy district